Qeshlaq (meaning "winter quarters", loaned from Turkic), also rendered as Qeshlag, may refer to:
 Kishlak, winter quarters

Ardabil Province
 Qeshlaq, Ardabil, a village in Germi County
 Qeshlaq-e Gharbi Rural District
 Qeshlaq-e Jonubi Rural District
 Qeshlaq-e Sharqi Rural District
 Qeshlaq-e Shomali Rural District

East Azerbaijan Province
 Qeshlaq, Ahar, a village in Ahar County
 Qeshlaq, Azarshahr, a village in Azarshahr County
 Qeshlaq, Jolfa, a village in Jolfa County
 Qeshlaq, Khoda Afarin, a village in Khoda Afarin County
 Qeshlaq, Maragheh, a village in Maragheh County
 Qeshlaq, Meyaneh, a village in Meyaneh County
 Qeshlaq, Kondovan, a village in Meyaneh County
 Qeshlaq, Osku, a village in Osku County
 Qeshlaq, Sarab, a village in Sarab County
 Qeshlaq, Varzaqan, a village in Varzaqan County
 Qeshlaq Rural District (Ahar County)
 Qeshlaq Rural District (Kaleybar County)

Fars Province
 Qeshlaq, Arsanjan, a village in Arsanjan County
 Qeshlaq, Kharameh, a village in Kharameh County
 Qeshlaq, Khorrambid, a village in Khorrambid County
 Qeshlaq Rural District (Fars Province), in Khorrambid County

Gilan Province
 Qeshlaq, Gilan, a village in Siahkal County

Golestan Province
 Qeshlaq, Golestan, Iran

Hamadan Province
 Qeshlaq, Hamadan, Iran
 Qeshlaq, alternate name of Qeshlaq Baba Rostam, Hamadan Province, Iran
 Qeshlaq, alternate name of Qeshlaq-e Dehnow, Hamadan Province, Iran
 Qeshlaq, alternate name of Qeshlaq-e Hameh Kasi, Hamadan Province, Iran
 Qeshlaq, alternate name of Qeshlaq-e Pust Shuran, Hamadan Province, Iran
 Qeshlaq-e Olya, Hamadan, Iran
 Qeshlaq-e Sofla, Iran

Isfahan Province
 Qeshlaq, Isfahan, a village in Golpayegan County

Kermanshah Province
 Qeshlaq-e Olya, Harsin, a village in Harsin County
 Qeshlaq, Kermanshah, a village in Kermanshah County
 Qeshlaq, alternate name of Qeshlaq-e Beznabad, Kermanshah County
 Qeshlaq, Ravansar, a village in Ravansar County
 Qeshlaq-e Olya, Sahneh, a village in Sahneh County
 Qeshlaq-e Vosta, a village in Sahneh County
 Qeshlaq, Sonqor, a village in Sonqor County
 Qeshlaq, Kolyai, a village in Sonqor County

Khuzestan Province

Kurdistan Province
 Qeshlaq, Kurdistan, a village in Saqqez County

Lorestan Province
 Qeshlaq, Lorestan, Iran
 Qeshlaq, alternate name of Kashkak, Lorestan, a village in Lorestan Province, Iran
 Qeshlaq-e Ganjeh, a village in Lorestan Province, Iran

Markazi Province
 Qeshlaq, Markazi, Iran

North Khorasan Province
 Qeshlaq, North Khorasan, Iran
 Qeshlaq, alternate name of Chahar Kharvar, North Khorasan Province, Iran

Qazvin Province
 Qeshlaq, Qazvin, Iran
 Qeshlaq-e Charkhlu, a village in Qazvin Province, Iran

Razavi Khorasan Province
 Qeshlaq, Mashhad, Razavi Khorasan Province, Iran
 Qeshlaq, Quchan, Razavi Khorasan Province, Iran

Semnan Province
 Qeshlaq, former name of Garmsar, Iran

Tehran Province
 Qeshlaq-e Mehrchin, a village in Tehran Province, Iran

West Azerbaijan Province
 Qeshlaq, Bukan, a village in Bukan County
 Qeshlaq, West Azerbaijan, a village in Khoy County
 Qeshlaq-e Shakur, a village in Urmia County

Zanjan Province
 Qeshlaq, Abhar, a village in Abhar County
 Qishlaq, Tarom, a village in Tarom County
 Qeshlaq, Zanjan, a village in Zanjan County

See also
 Qeshlaq is a common element of Iranian place names; see .
 Qışlaq (disambiguation), places in Azerbaijan and Armenia
 Kışla